Este es el romance del Aniceto y la Francisca, de cómo quedó trunco, comenzó la tristeza y unas pocas cosas más…, or simply El Romance del Aniceto y la Francisca, is a 1967 Argentine romantic drama film directed and written by Leonardo Favio, based on the short story El cenizo by Jorge Zuhair Jury, Favio's older brother. The film stars Federico Luppi, Elsa Daniel, María Vaner and Edgardo Suárez.

El Romance del Aniceto y la Francisca received unanimous acclaim and won four Silver Condor Awards: Best Film, Best Actor for Luppi, Best Actress for Daniel and Best Supporting Actor for Suárez. A remake of the film, Aniceto, was released in 2008, also directed by Favio.

It was selected as the ninth greatest Argentine film of all time in a poll conducted by the Museo del Cine Pablo Ducrós Hicken in 1984, while it ranked 5th in the 2000 edition. In a new version of the survey organized in 2022 by the specialized magazines La vida util, Taipei and La tierra quema, presented at the Mar del Plata International Film Festival, the film reached the 13 position.

Cast

 Federico Luppi ... Aniceto
 Elsa Daniel ... Francisca
 María Vaner ... Lucía
 Edgardo Suárez ... Renato
 Cacho Mendoza ... The Man in the Cockpit
 Eduardo Vargas ... Golazo
 Ernesto Cutrera ... Don Yiyo's son
 Walter Sanchez
 Joly Bergali
 Rafael Chumbito
 Mario Savino

References

External links
 

1967 films
1967 romantic drama films
Argentine black-and-white films
Argentine romantic drama films
Films based on short fiction
Films directed by Leonardo Favio
Silver Condor Award for Best Film winners
Cockfighting in film
1960s Argentine films